The 1987 Bulgarian Cup Final was the 47th final of the Bulgarian Cup, and was contested between CSKA Sofia and Levski Sofia on 13 May 1987 at Vasil Levski National Stadium in Sofia. CSKA won the final 2–1.

Match

Details

See also
1986–87 A Group

References

Bulgarian Cup finals
PFC CSKA Sofia matches
PFC Levski Sofia matches
Cup Final